Geiger is a town in Sumter County, Alabama, United States. It incorporated in 1912. At the 2010 census the population was 170, up from 161 in 2000.

Geography
Geiger is located at  (32.868543, -88.306061).

Demographics

As of the 2010 United States Census, there were 170 people living in the town. The racial makeup of the town was 72.4% Black and 24.7% White. 2.9% were Hispanic or Latino of any race.

As of the census of 2000, there were 161 people, 56 households, and 40 families residing in 70 housing units in the town. The racial makeup of the town was 29.8% White and 70.2% Black or African American.

There were 56 households, out of which 32% had children under the age of 18 living with them, 45% were married couples living together, 18% had a female householder with no husband present, and 27% were non-families. 23% of all households were made up of individuals, and 14% had someone living alone who was 65 years of age or older. The average household size was 2.9 and the average family size was 3.5.

In the town, the population was spread out, with 30% under the age of 18, 11% from 18 to 24, 23% from 25 to 44, 22% from 45 to 64, and 14% who were 65 years of age or older. The median age was 36 years. For every 100 females, there were approximately 83 males. For every 100 females age 18 and over, there were approximately 90 males.

The median income for a household in the town was $17,917, and the median income for a family was $23,750. Males had a median income of $30,625 versus $10,417 for females. The per capita income for the town was $8,585. About 33% of families and 41% of the population were below the poverty line, including 60% of those under the age of 18 and 33% of those 65 or over.

Notable people
Jimmie Rodgers, country singer in the early 20th century, known most widely for his rhythmic yodeling
Bobby Williams, former American football player in the National Football League.

References

Towns in Sumter County, Alabama
Towns in Alabama